Chittoor district is one of the eight districts in the Rayalaseema region of the Indian state of Andhra Pradesh. The district headquarters is located at Chittoor. It has a population of 18,72,951 according to 2011 census of India. It lies in the Poini River Valley of southernmost Andhra Pradesh along the Chennai–Bangalore section of Chennai-Mumbai highway. Chittoor district is a major market centre for mangoes, grains, sugarcane, and peanuts.

Etymology 

The district derived its name from its headquarters Chittoor.

History 
After the Indian independence in 1947, Chittoor became a part of the erstwhile Madras state. The modern Chittoor District was formerly Arcot District, which was established by the British in the 19th century had Chittoor as its headquarters. On 1 April 1911, district was split into Chittoor District and North Arcot Districts.

Chittoor District was formed on 1 April 1911, taking Chittoor, Palamaneru, Tirupati, from the then North Arcot District of Madras State and Madanapalle, Vayalpadu from Kadapa and Pileru, Punganur, Sri Kalahasti, Karvetinagar from Zamindari tahsils of the Chittoor district to form united Chittoor district. In 1960, 319 villages in Chittoor district were added into Chingleput District now Kanchipuram district and Thiruvallur districts of Tamil Nadu and subsequently Sathyavedu and Kuppam of Chingleput District was transferred to Chittoor district on linguistic basis based on the Act called The Andhra Pradesh And Madras (Alteration Of Boundaries) Act, 1959.

From 4 April 2022, Chittoor District is divided into 3 districts. The districts are Tirupati District, Annamayya District and Chittoor District.

Geography 

Chittoor is a part of Rayalaseema region of Andhra Pradesh. The district is bounded by Annamayya district to the north, Krishnagiri District, tirupattur District, Vellore District and Tiruvallur District of Tamil Nadu state to the south, Tirupati District to the east, Kolar District of Karnataka state to the west. Chittoor District lies extreme south of the Andhra Pradesh state approximately between 12°37′ - 14°8′ north latitudes and 78°3′ - 79°55′ east longitudes. Thirty percent of the total land area is covered by forests in the district. Mango and tamarind groves surround the city of Chittoor, and cattle are raised in the district. The soils in the district constitute red loamy 57%, red sandy 34% and the remaining 9% is covered by black clay black loamy, black sandy and red clay Chittoor is 160 km from Chennai, 180 km from Bangalore and 590 km from Hyderabad.

Hydrology and climate 
The important rivers in the district are Ponnai and Swarnamukhi rivers which originate in the Eastern Ghats. Other rivers include Kusasthali, Beema, Bahuda, Pincha, Kalyani, Araniyar and Pedderu. None of the rivers are perennial. Main rivers include Swarnamukhi, Kalangi, Papaghni, Koundinya, Pileru, Arani, Pinchcha, Cheyyeru, Neeva and Kusasthali. The district has a very short coastline, bordered by the Bay of Bengal.
The temperature in the western parts of the district like Pileru, Punganur, Madanapalle, Horsley Hills are relatively lower than the eastern parts of the Chittoor District. This is because of the higher altitude of the western parts compared to the eastern parts. The summer temperatures touches 44 °C in the eastern parts whereas in the western parts it ranges around 36° to 38 °C. Similarly the winter temperatures of the western parts are relatively low ranging around 12 °C to 14 °C and in eastern parts it is 16 °C to 18 °C. Most of a district has a Tropical wet and dry climate, with some north-western parts having Hot semi-arid climate.

Chittoor district receives an annual rainfall of 918.1 mm. The South West Monsoon and North East Monsoon are the major sources of rainfall for the district. On average the district receives 438.0 mm of rainfall through the South West Monsoon (From June to September) and 396.0 mm from North East Monsoon (From October to December). The rainfall received by the district in the years 2002 and 2003 are 984.2 mm and 934 mm respectively.

Demographics 
According to the 2011 census, Chittoor district has a population of 4,174,064. This gives it a ranking of 47th in India (out of a total of 640) and 6th in its state. Its population growth rate over the decade 2001–2011 was 11.33%. Chittoor has a sex ratio of 1002 females for every 1000 males, and a literacy rate of 72.36%.

After bifurcation, the district had a population of 18,72,951, of which 368,644 (19.68%) lived in urban areas. Chittoor district has a sex ratio of 993 females per 1000 males. Scheduled Castes and Scheduled Tribes made up 3,94,327 (21.05%) and 51,574 (2.75%) of the population respectively.

In 2007–2008 the International Institute for Population Sciences interviewed 1010 households in 38 villages across the district. They found that 92.7% had access to electricity, 99.6% had drinking water, 33.3% toilet facilities, and 53.8% lived in a pucca (permanent) home. 29.3% of girls wed before the legal age of 18 and 88.2% of interviewees carried a BPL card.

At the time of the 2011 census, 73.23% of the population spoke Telugu, 16.75% Tamil and 8.72% Urdu as their first language.

Telugu is the primary official language of the district along with English. Tamil is widely spoken in the border areas, especially in Kuppam.

Administrative Divisions 

The district is divided into 4 revenue divisions which are Nagari, Chittoor, Palamaneru and Kuppam. Each revenue division is divided into mandals. The district has 32 mandals under these 4 revenue divisions. There are 1 Municipal Corporations of Chittoor and 4 municipalities of Kuppam, Punganur, Palamaner and Nagari in the district.

Before formation of Mandal System, Administration was done through Talukas System. Here are the Previous Talukas in the district.

Politics 
There are two Parliamentary & seven assembly constituencies located in this district.

The Parliamentary constituencies are Chittoor (Lok Sabha constituency), Rajampet Lok Sabha constituency.

The assembly constituency are:

Towns in district 

Source for Above Population

https://censusindia.gov.in/2011census/dchb/2823_PART_A_DCHB_CHITTOOR.pdf

Villages 
 

Govindareddipalle
Thavanampalle

Economy 

The primary, secondary and tertiary sectors of the district contribute ,  and  respectively. The major products contributing to the GVA of the district from agriculture and allied services are, sugarcane, groundnut, tomato, mango, milk, meat and fisheries. The GVA to the industrial and service sector is contributed from construction, electricity, manufacturing, education and ownership of dwellings.

In 2006 the Indian government named Chittoor one of the country's 250 most backward districts (out of a total of 640). It is one of the thirteen districts in Andhra Pradesh currently receiving funds from the Backward Regions Grant Fund Programme (BRGF).

Notable people

 Mumtaz Ali, philosopher and educationist
 M. A. Ayyangar, first deputy speaker and second Speaker of Lok Sabha
 Bhuvaneswari (actress), film actress
 Jiddu Krishnamurti, philosopher
 Bindu Madhavi, film actress
 V. Nagayya, film actor
 D. K. Adikesavulu Naidu, Member of Parliament
 Gali Muddu Krishnama Naidu, politician
 N. Chandrababu Naidu, Chief Minister of United Andhra Pradesh (1995–2004), and first Chief Minister of Residual State Of Andhra Pradesh (2014–2019)
 Rama Prabha, actress
 Madhurantakam Rajaram, writer, Sahitya Akademi Award winner
 Shobha Raju, musician, devotional singer, writer and composer, an exponent of sankirtana of the gospel of the 15th-century saint-composer, Annamacharya
 Cattamanchi Ramalinga Reddy, educationist and political thinker, essayist and economist, poet and literary critic
 P. Chinnamma Reddy, politician
 N. Kiran Kumar Reddy, former Chief Minister of Andhra Pradesh (2010–2014)
 Pratap C Reddy, founder of Apollo Hospitals
 Raj Reddy, Computer Scientist and winner of Turing Award
 Roja Selvamani, actress
 Saptagiri (actor), Telugu film actor
 Shafi (actor), film actor

Transport 
The district has road connectivity by means of national and state highways. The main part of the
National Highways runs through Chittoor City National Highway 69 and National Highway 40 that connects the main metro cities of South India from Bangalore to Chennai. NH 716 connecting Chennai in Tamil Nadu passes through the district.

Education 
The primary and secondary school education is imparted by government, aided and private schools, under the School Education Department of the state. As per the school information report for the academic year 2015–16, there are a total of 6,100 schools. They include, 45 government, 4,507 mandal and zilla parishads, 2 residential, 1,268 private, 17 model, 20 Kasturba Gandhi Balika Vidyalaya (KGBV), 158 municipal and 84 other types of schools. The total number of students enrolled in primary, upper primary and high schools of the district are 562,504. Chittoor district is home to the National Atmospheric Research Laboratory (NARL) of the Department of Space. The lab is involved in carrying out fundamental and applied research in Atmospheric and Space Sciences. It also has Dravidian University, Government Intermediate, Degree and Polytechnic Colleges.

Temples 
There are forty-three temples under the management of Endowments Department.

See also 

Kanipakam

References

External links 

 Official site

 
Districts of Andhra Pradesh
Rayalaseema
1911 establishments in India